is a high-fantasy video game series created by Japanese game designers Shigeru Miyamoto and Takashi Tezuka. It is primarily developed and published by Nintendo, although some portable installments have been outsourced to Capcom, Vanpool and Grezzo. The series' gameplay incorporates elements of action, adventure and puzzle-solving games.

The series centers on Link, the playable character and protagonist. Link is often given the task of rescuing Princess Zelda and the kingdom of Hyrule from Ganon, who is the series' principal antagonist; however, other settings and antagonists have appeared in several games. The plots commonly involve a relic known as the Triforce, a set of three omnipotent golden triangles.

Since the original The Legend of Zelda's release in 1986, the series has expanded to include 19 entries on all of Nintendo's major game consoles, as well as a number of spin-offs. An American animated TV series based on the games aired in 1989. Individual manga adaptations commissioned by Nintendo have been produced in Japan since 1997. The Legend of Zelda is one of Nintendo's most prominent and successful franchises, selling over 80 million copies as of 2017; many of its games are considered by critics and fans alike to be among the greatest video games of all time.

Central characters

Link 

Link is a Hylian youth who characteristically wears a green tunic and pointed cap. He has pointed ears and the Triforce symbol on his left hand. Each incarnation of Link is humble, hard-working, brave, and worthy to bear the Triforce of Courage. The various incarnations of Link each have a special title related to being a "Hero", such as "Hero of Time" in Ocarina of Time. In the video games, he is generally a silent protagonist, but does speak in the Legend of Zelda cartoon series and the CD-i games from The Legend of Zelda series produced by Philips.

Princess Zelda

Princess Zelda is Hyrule's princess and the guardian of the Triforce of Wisdom. While older titles require Link to save Zelda from Ganon, she, since Ocarina of Time has been mostly shown to be capable in battle, using magical powers and arrows, to aid Link. Zelda occasionally has aliases and alter egos, including Sheik in Ocarina of Time and Tetra in The Wind Waker and Phantom Hourglass. She is only a playable character in Spirit Tracks of the main games, though she also playable in spin-offs such as Hyrule Warriors, or other games such as Super Smash Bros..

Ganon

Ganon  is the series' primary villain and final boss. His specific motives vary across games, but general themes include seeking the triforce for power and destruction, and kidnapping Princess Zelda as a means to that end.

Antagonists

Dark Link
Dark Link is a recurring boss and doppelgänger of Link with black coloring and red eyes. He generally copies Link's swordplay, and sometimes can use Link's full arsenal of weapons. His first appearance was as the final boss of The Adventure of Link. In Oracle of Ages, multiple Shadow Links are summoned by the sorceress Veran during the final battle. Further appearances as an antagonist occur in Four Swords Adventures and Ocarina of Time in the main Zelda series, as an in-game opponent and as a downloadable costume for the spinoff Hyrule Warriors, and as an optional costume for Link in most entries of the Super Smash Bros. series. In 2010 IGN ranked Dark Link as 77th on its list of the Top 100 Video Game Villains.

Agahnim
Agahnim is an evil wizard who is a major villain in A Link to the Past. He assisted the Royal Family by dispelling multiple plagues and became their trusted advisor for a time. However, he soon displayed his true colors and seized power for himself by killing the King of Hyrule and brainwashing the castle soldiers. Agahnim begins capturing the descendants of the Seven Sages and banishes them to the Dark World to release Ganon from his imprisonment. Link is unable to stop Agahnim from capturing Princess Zelda, Agahnim escapes to the Dark World and drags Link with him. After a battle atop of Ganon's Tower, just prior to his defeat, it is revealed that his body is a vessel for Ganon's soul. In Link's Awakening, Agahnim's Shadow was one of the Shadows of Link's former foes who attacked Link in the final battle in Koholint Island's Wind Fish Egg.

Nightmares
 are evil monsters and primary villains of The Legend of Zelda: Link's Awakening. They invade the island of Koholint in hopes of ruling over it. They include  a segmented worm who guards the Full Moon Cello in the Tail Cave,  a clown-like spirit in a jar who guards the Conch Horn in the Bottle Grotto,  a huge, one-eyed slime who guards the Sea Lily's Bell in the Key Cavern,  a huge angler fish who guards the Surf Harp in the Angler's Tunnel,  a massive eel who guards the Wind Marimba in the Catfish's Maw,  a disembodied face who guards the Coral Triangle in the Face Shrine,  a huge, bizarre-looking eagle who guards the Organ of Evening Calm in the Eagle's Tower,  a disembodied head cloaked in fire who guards the Thunder Drum in the Turtle Rock, and  a shadowy being who is the one who put the Wind Fish to sleep and the final Nightmare to face.

Twinrova
They can brainwash others to serve him and merge to form the stronger witch Twinrova; the brooms they use to fly become scepters that channel Twinrova's power. They appear in Ocarina of Time, Majora's Mask, Oracle of Seasons, and Oracle of Ages.

Majora
Majora is the main villain of Majora's Mask, once used by a nameless tribe for hexing and torture. The mask is primarily seen being worn over the face of Skull Kid, who, corrupted by Majora's influences, uses the mask's dark magic to wreak havoc across Termina. During the final boss, two more forms of Majora are shown; Majora's Incarnation and Majora's Wrath. Both are humanoid creatures, though Majora's Wrath has long, whip-like arms.

Vaati
 is the antagonist of The Legend of Zelda: Four Swords, Four Swords Adventures and The Minish Cap. His most common appearance is a black orb with a single eye, though he was originally a human-shaped sorcerer. In Four Swords, Vaati is initially sealed in the Four Sword weapon but escapes and captures Princess Zelda, only to be returned to the sword by Link, who is split into four by the sword. In the sequel, Four Swords Adventures, he escapes with Princess Zelda again with the help of Ganon, forcing Link to be split up and defeat him. Before the events of The Minish Cap, Vaati was a Picori that became corrupted by the evil in the hearts of mankind. He used the Wishing Cap created by his master, Ezlo, to transform himself into a Hylian sorcerer, and seeks out the power of the Light Force.

Usurper King Zant
 is the enemy of the Twili who willingly offered himself to Ganondorf, whom he saw as a god, so he could dispose of Midna and invade Hyrule. Though Midna recruits Link to help her collect Fused Shadows so she can regain both her original form and her birthright as the ruler of the Twili, Zant reveals his curse on Midna was placed by Ganon after being fatally wounded. The final battle against Zant involves fighting him in the arenas of other bosses and sub-bosses before fighting him in front of Hyrule Castle. During the events of Hyrule Warriors, Cia summons Zant from the past to fight for her before he becomes a follower of the revived Ganondorf following Cia's defeat.

Demise
, first introduced in Skyward Sword, is a deity who had conquered time itself. He was punished by the Goddess Hylia and turned into a monster called the Imprisoned when he tried to take the Triforce. His sword, which assumes the form of the Demon Lord Ghirahim, tracks down Hylia's reincarnation, Zelda, and uses her lifeforce to resurrect Demise. Impressed to see a Hylian like Link willing to stand up to him, Demise decides to battle him out of amusement. After Link mortally wounds him and restores Zelda's soul to her body, Demise's remains are sealed within the Master Sword. Hyrule Historia confirms Ganondorf is Demise's reincarnation. In Hyrule Warriors, Demise appears in his Imprisoned form before being defeated.

Ghirahim
 is encountered several times throughout Skyward Sword, as he relentlessly pursues Zelda to revive Demise. Though he appears delicate and acts in a playful, flamboyant, conceited manner, Ghirahim is a cruel sadist with a dangerous short-fused temper. He arrogantly toys with Link in their first two battles, then reveals his full power in a final battle prior to Demise's release. With his mission accomplished, Ghirahim is revealed to be the spirit of Demise's sword, given life so he could resurrect his master. He returns to his sword form before being shattered during Demise's climactic battle with Link. During the events of Hyrule Warriors, Cia summons Ghirahim from the past to fight for her before he becomes a follower of Ganondorf after her defeat. Ghirahim also appears in Super Smash Bros. for Nintendo 3DS and Wii U as an Assist Trophy.

Yuga
Yuga is the main villain of A Link Between Worlds. He hunted the descendants of the Seven Sages and Princess Zelda to resurrect Ganon and use his power to rule the worlds of Hyrule and Lorule. He is a sorcerer who can transform himself and others into two-dimensional art. With his magic staff, he can trap people within picture frames, turning them into Lorule paintings.

Master Kohga
Master Kohga is a character in Breath of the Wild and the leader of the Yiga Clan. Lazy and egotistical, Kohga spends most of his time sleeping in the Yiga Clan's hideout, located in the desert through the Karusa Valley, while the rest of his clan scour Hyrule in search of Link. When Link infiltrates the Yiga hideout to confront him, Kohga unintentionally kills himself by summoning a spiked ball that rolls over him and sends him falling to his demise. 

In Hyrule Warriors: Age of Calamity, Kohga is aided by a second-in-command named Sooga, a powerful Yiga warrior recognized for his twin swords and cracked mask. When Yiga soldiers are sacrificed by Astor for Calamity Ganon, Sooga and Kohga swear to avenge their comrades, leading to a battle that Kohga survives, but Sooga's fate is left unknown. Kohga later swears fealty to the Hyruleans forces to keep his at his efforts.

Supporting characters

Epona

Epona is Link's horse who assists him in Ocarina of Time, Majora's Mask, Twilight Princess and Breath of the Wild. She comes to Link's aid when called by her special song, which he plays on the ocarina in Ocarina of Time and Majora's Mask, and on a blade of "horse grass" in Twilight Princess.

Fi

 is a female humanoid representation of the Goddess Sword, which later evolves into the Master Sword, in Skyward Sword. Fi serves as Link's logical-minded companion and assists him throughout the game. In the end, after Demon King Demise is sealed within the Master Sword, Fi reveals her last order from the goddess is to let Link put her into an endless sleep within the weapon, which he does after encouragement from Fi and Zelda. Fi appears as a playable character in Hyrule Warriors.

Golden Goddesses
The three Golden Goddesses (Din, Farore and Nayru) are responsible for the creation of Hyrule, as well as the creation of the Triforce, which houses a fraction of their divine power. Din is the Goddess of Power, associated with the color red and the elements of earth and fire; Farore is the Goddess of Courage, associated with the color green and the elements of wind and forest; and Nayru is the Goddess of Wisdom, associated with the color blue and the elements of water and time. Each Goddess is also associated with a fragment of the Triforce– Din with the Triforce of Power, Farore with the Triforce of Courage, and Nayru with the Triforce of Wisdom. Each Goddess has a spell that Link may acquire from a Great Fairy – Din's Fire, Farore's Wind, and Nayru's Love. In Skyward Sword, they are collectively referred to as the "old gods", in contrast to the goddess Hylia. The trio has appeared across many titles in the series, sometimes as major plot points, and other times just as cameos or passing mentions.

Great Deku Tree
The Great Deku Tree is the name given to a large tree that watches over forests and their inhabitants. He first appears in Ocarina of Time, where he is charged with watching over the Kokiri, a childlike race of forest spirits that live in the Kokiri Forest. He is an ancient, exceptionally large tree, with a humanoid face and big mustache. He suffers from a curse cast upon him by Ganon, who wishes to gain the power of the Spiritual Stone of the Forest. The Deku Tree sends Navi to retrieve Link to destroy the cause of the curse. While Link does so, it is too late, and he succumbs to the curse. Seven years in the future, Link discovers a little sprout, which grows into the Deku Sprout, his successor. In The Wind Waker, the Great Deku Tree is the guardian of Forest Haven and is a legendary forest and earth spirit. Similarly, in the game, he confesses to Link that his energy is waning and that he has become feeble with age. He also appears in Breath of the Wild where he is tasked by Zelda to guard the Master Sword in the Korok Forest while Link recovers from his injuries.

Groose
Groose is a bully from the Knights' Academy in Skyward Sword. He is often hostile and working to undermine Link due to his jealousy of Link's close relationship with Zelda. Over time, through Link's exploits and his own shortcomings, he is humbled and becomes more helpful. He builds a catapult called "The Groosenator" to aid Link in halting the imprisoned Demon King Demise from escaping the pit of the Sealed Grounds and reaching the Sealed Temple, and looks after the elderly Impa of the Sealed Grounds.

Happy Mask Salesman
The  is a mysterious man who travels the world collecting masks. In Ocarina of Time and Oracle of Ages, he sells masks that factor into item-trading sidequests separate from the main game. In Majora's Mask, he plays a more integral role. On his travels to find rare masks, he is ambushed by the Skull Kid and his two fairies, Tatl and Tael; they steal Majora's Mask, a powerful, but malevolent, mask. Noticing that Link has been cursed into a Deku Scrub by the Skull Kid, the Happy Mask Salesman offers to undo the curse in return for Majora's Mask and Link's Ocarina of Time. The Happy Mask Salesman also provides Link with information about the various masks that can be recovered within the game whenever Link speaks with him. IGN ranked him number four on its list of the Top 20 Weirdest Zelda Characters: "With his manic smile, followed by that hideous sneer, followed by all other manner of mood swings, this guy was downright unsettling".

Impa

 is a caretaker to Princess Zelda. There are many incarnations of the character named Impa throughout the Zelda series, all being from the head family of the Sheikah Tribe, just as there are multiple incarnations of Link and Zelda. As with Link and Zelda, all incarnations of Impa share certain personality traits. She is involved in most mainline entries of the series, and playable in the Hyrule Warriors spin-off games.

Kaepora Gaebora
 is a wise owl who guides Link throughout various games in the series. In Ocarina of Time, he is referred to as the reincarnation of an ancient sage. Hyrule Historia clarifies he is Rauru, the Sage of Light. He is also present in Majora's Mask, along with statues of his likeness which are used as warp points. In Link's Awakening, a similar owl guides Link, and arrives at certain points to provide hints and backstory.

King of Hyrule
The King of Hyrule is the title given to the various ruling monarchs of Hyrule, and generally also the father of Princess Zelda in most of his incarnations. Appearing in many entries, his presence is often relegated to cameos, backstory, or lore. In The Minish Cap and The Wind Waker titles he plays a larger role, in the latter, his identity is revealed to be the sentient red sailboat that had been acompanying and assisting Link throughout the game. He later appears as a playable character in Hyrule Warriors Legends. In Breath of the Wild, his deceased spirit poses as an elderly wanderer to aid Link in his quest to save his daughter.

Linebeck
Linebeck first appears in Phantom Hourglass as one of the main characters who helps Link save the World of the Ocean King from Bellum. He provides transport for Link in his ship, the S. S. Linebeck, and is greedy and self-centered. For the first half of the game, his goal is to obtain the Ghost Ship's treasure. After the Ghost Ship's treasure is revealed to be merely a rumor devised by Bellum to attract people it, Oshus, revealed as the Ocean King, promises Linebeck one wish if he continues to sail Link across the oceans. This is to be granted after Bellum is defeated. In the endgame, showing a rare burst of courage, Linebeck saves Link and Tetra from Bellum by stabbing him. Bellum, enraged, then possesses Linebeck. After Bellum is defeated by Link once again, he finally dies, and Linebeck is freed. Linebeck has been considerably humbled at this point, however, when the now-restored Ocean King asks him what his wish will be, Linebeck first questions whether he even has to make a wish, then decides that he merely wants to have his ship back (it was destroyed by Bellum just before he possessed Linebeck), rather than asking for some great treasure. In Spirit Tracks, Linebeck's grandson, Linebeck III, runs Linebeck Trading at the Trading Outpost in New Hyrule. Linebeck III hires a bridgemaker to build a bridge for Link, in exchange for a precious ring he retrieves from the resting place of the original Linebeck.

Midna

 is one of the main characters in The Legend of Zelda: Twilight Princess. She is an imp-like creature and the princess of the Twili race who serves as Link's companion, much like Navi in Ocarina of Time. Initially Midna shows contempt for Link and uses him to further her own goals; however, she grows to like him and continues to help him on his quest. Midna is shown to be a kind-hearted character, even though she was born in the Twilight Realm. She is the counterpart to Link's battles as a wolf in the Realm of Twilight. Midna returns in Hyrule Warriors as a playable character in both her imp and Twili forms.

Navi

 is a fairy who is Link's "navigator" throughout The Legend of Zelda: Ocarina of Time. The Great Deku Tree in Kokiri Forest instructed Navi to assist Link in his quest to stop Ganondorf. All Kokiri have companion fairies, but because Link is actually a Hylian, he does not receive one until Navi joins him near the beginning of Ocarina of Time. In gameplay, Navi functions primarily as a guide that points out clues in the environment and helps the player learn the controls and advance in the game. Most of her hints are about how to progress in the story or defeat enemies. She can also be used to lock onto enemies, items and other characters in the game. She is one of the few characters with any voice-acting in the series, and one of the few characters who uses English words, such as "Hey", "Look", "Listen", "Watch out", and "Hello". Navi leaves Link at the end of the game after he puts the Master Sword back in the Pedestal of Time. In The Legend of Zelda: Majora's Mask, Link sets out to search for a "beloved and invaluable friend," which leads him into the land of Termina. It is strongly implied this friend is Navi.

GamesRadar editor Mikel Reparaz ranked Navi as the most irritating female character, writing that she would have been bearable if she did not interrupt the game constantly with "Hey!" and "Listen!". Fellow GamesRadar editor Tom Goulter listed her as the second most annoying sidekick ever.

Princess Hilda
Princess Hilda is the princess of Lorule in A Link Between Worlds, both Zelda and Hyrule's counterparts respectively.

Ravio
Ravio is a mysterious merchant and supporting character in The Legend of Zelda: A Link Between Worlds. After Link fails to stop Yuga from abducting Seres from the sanctuary, Ravio saves him and brings him back to his house. After Link awakens, he grants Ravio permission to stay in his house. Ravio sets up his shop and gives Link his bracelet, which prevents the hero from being turned into a painting by Yuga and allows him to traverse walls. Initially, Ravio will only rent items to Link and will send Sheerow to retrieve any rented items should Link fall in battle. He begins selling off his wares after Link finds the Master Sword and will thank Link for allowing him to make enough Rupees to retire early if every item in his shop is purchased.

After Yuga and Princess Hilda are defeated and Princess Zelda is freed, Ravio enters Lorule, where it is revealed that he is Link's Lorulian counterpart. A servant of Hilda's, Ravio did not agree with her plan to steal Hyrule's Triforce. He was afraid to stand up to them (in contrast to Link's courageous attitude), so he fled Lorule, hoping to find a hero who could stop Hilda and Yuga. He successfully convinces Hilda that stealing Hyrule's Triforce would only bring out the worst in Lorule, which was exactly the scenario their forebears had hoped to avoid when they destroyed it. The two see Link and Zelda off as they return to their own world. After Link and Zelda wish to restore Lorule's Triforce, Ravio and Hilda are seen in the Sacred Realm of Lorule as the clouds part and their Triforce is restored.

Ravio wears a purple outfit with a rabbit mask covering his face, likely referencing when Link was transformed into a rabbit upon entering the Dark World in A Link to the Past. When unmasked, he looks exactly like Link except his hair is parted to the left instead of the right and is black instead of brown or blonde. He also has a pet bird named Sheerow, who retrieves any items Link rented if Link is defeated.

Ravio is a playable character through downloadable content in Hyrule Warriors. He wields the Rental Hammer as his primary weapon and has been slightly redesigned to resemble the Hyrule Warriors incarnation of Link in both size and body proportions.

Sages
The Six Sages are a group of individuals destined to aid a chosen hero in times of crisis; as such, they possess varying magical powers and responsibilities. Each era has its own group of sages, and those groups often aid Link in different ways (though only after they are rescued).

The Six Sages (originally called "Wise Men") are first mentioned in A Link to the Past. The in-game story reveals that during the great Imprisoning War fought between the evil Ganon and the Knights of Hyrule, the Seven Sages combined their powers to banish the wicked sorcerer and seal him in the Sacred Realm; Ganon's corrupt heart then warped that region into the Dark World. After a few centuries, the wizard Agahnim appeared and placed spells on the King of Hyrule and his knights, bringing them under his control. Agahnim gathered the Six Maidens—the descendants of the original Sages–including Princess Zelda herself—and leached from their power to break the seal to the Dark World to resurrect Ganon. Link, after defeating Agahnim, journeyed across the Dark World to free the Seven Maidens, who used their combined strength to open the way to Ganon's Tower, the final dungeon of the game. After defeating Ganon and making a just wish on the Triforce, Link returned the Maidens to the Light World.

In the Ocarina of Time prequel, the story of the Sages from A Link to the Past is expanded; this was the first title in the series to refer to the group as "Sages". In this era, the Six Sages are the protectors of the Triforce and the Sacred Realm; the original Sages built the Temple of Time and established various special locks to prevent evildoers from entering that sanctuary. Exactly what happened to the original Sages is unknown; by the time of that game, there is only one remaining. When Ganondorf uses Link to bypass the Sages' protection and steal the Triforce for himself, his dark heart corrupts the Sacred Realm and sends evil power throughout five temples in Hyrule, transforming the world into a dark mirror of its former self. To save the kingdom, the powers of the Sacred Realm send out an "awakening call" to five special individuals, who are summoned to the temples to become the new Sages and thus break the curses on the holy sites. Link's quest throughout the second half of the game is to cleanse the five temples of monsters and allow the Sages to perform their duties, weakening Ganondorf's power and strengthening the group to perform a banishing ritual. The Sages of this era are:
 Rauru – a Hylian high priest and the Sage of Light; he is the last of the ancient Sages. He cares for Link during the hero's temporary imprisonment in the Sacred Realm and provides him with information about the Sages and the events of the past seven years. Rauru tasks Link with finding the five remaining Sages and gives him the Light Medallion to begin the quest.
 Saria – a Kokiri girl and the Sage of Forest; she was one of Link's only childhood friends. When monsters seized the Kokiri Forest because of to Ganondorf's curse, Saria traveled to the Forest Temple to solve the problem herself. After Link defeated the ghostly Phantom Ganon, Saria awakened as a Sage and used her new powers to break the spell, freeing the forest from evil influences and ushering in a new era of peace.
 Darunia – leader of a tribe of rock-eating giants known as Gorons, and the Sage of Fire; he considers Link a "Sworn Brother" after Link helps his people by defeating King Dodongo, who had taken over the Goron's mines causing a food shortage. Seven years later, the Gorons resisted Ganondorf's rule after he took over Hyrule; as punishment, he captured nearly all of them and prepared to feed them to the monstrous dragon Volvagia in the Fire Temple. Darunia traveled to the Temple to free his people and briefly met Link inside. After Link freed the Gorons and slayed Volvagia, Darunia awakened as a Sage and added his power to Link's. Darunia returns as a playable character in Hyrule Warriors.
 Princess Ruto – a Zora and the Sage of Water; she is the Princess of the Zora people. The Zora refused to follow Ganondorf's rule, so he punished them by sealing their entire domain in ice. The mysterious Sheik saved Ruto and traveled to the Water Temple to break Ganondorf's curse. Ruto met Link, whom she was engaged to as a child due to a misunderstanding and showed him the way through the temple. After Link killed Morpha, the source of the curse, Ruto awakened as the Water Sage and reluctantly put her marriage on hold to aid him. Ruto returns as a playable character in Hyrule Warriors.
 Nabooru – a Gerudo and the Sage of Spirit; she is the second-in-command of the Gerudo tribe, a race of thieves. Nabooru protested Ganondorf's cruelty toward innocents and traveled to the Spirit Temple to interfere with the wizard's plans, recruiting Young Link to recover a rare pair of Silver Gauntlets for her. Twinrova, Ganondorf's surrogate mothers, kidnapped Nabooru and brainwashed her into becoming his follower. After Link defeated the witches, Nabooru awakened as a Sage and delighted in the prospect of vengeance against her captors.
 Impa – this incarnation of Impa is a Sheikah, Zelda's nursemaid, the Sage of Shadow, and the founder and leader of Kakariko Village. When Bongo Bongo broke free and attacked the village, Impa traveled to the Shadow Temple to reseal the monster. Link went to the temple to assist her and defeated Bongo Bongo, allowing Impa to awaken as the Sage and join the group.
 Zelda – Zelda is ultimately revealed as the Seventh Sage, who leads the rest of the group. After removing her disguise as the Sheikah ninja Sheik, she is captured by Ganondorf and brought to his Tower; the Six Sages aid Link by undoing the barriers the wizard established to protect himself. After defeating Ganondorf and escaping the tower, Link and Zelda found themselves fighting Ganon, who is revealed as a monster Ganondorf becomes when he uses the Triforce of Power. After Link incapacitates Ganon, Zelda calls upon the Six Sages, who combine their powers, open the door to the Sacred Realm, and seal Ganondorf away.

The Legend of Zelda: The Wind Waker reveals the existence of a new group of Sages (though the Sages from Ocarina of Time appear as stained-glass windows in the basement of Hyrule Castle) responsible for keeping the evil-repelling power in the Master Sword by praying to the gods in their temples. After being resurrected, Ganondorf immediately attacked those temples and killed their Sages, thus robbing the blade of its magical abilities and protecting himself from it. Link meets the ghosts of these original sages and is tasked with finding their descendants, bringing them to their respective temples, and restoring the power to repel evil to the Master Sword. The Sages of this world are:
 Medli: A young Rito girl and the Sage of Earth, she is the apprentice attendant of Valoo, a powerful dragon and the Sky Spirit. When not serving Valoo, she tends to young Prince Komali and practices her harp, the symbol of the Sage of Earth. Her ancestor Laruto, a Zora, was the original Sage; Laruto teaches Link the Earth God's Lyric and appears to Medli in a vision to inform her of her sacred duty. Medli travels to the Earth Temple with Link, helps him navigate it, and eventually begins offering up her prayers, which restores the energy and edge of the Master Sword. She later reappears as a downloadable player in Hyrule Warriors.
 Makar: A young Korok and the Sage of Wind, he is one of the beloved children of the Great Deku Tree. During the annual Seeding Ceremony, Makar performs a special song on a leafy cello, the symbol of the Sage of Wind. His ancestor Fado, a Kokiri and the original sage, teaches Link the Wind God's Aria to awaken Makar to his destiny. Though Makar is captured in the Wind Temple, Link frees him, and he assists Link and fully restores the power to repel evil to the Master Sword, which manifests as a brilliant glow.

The Legend of Zelda: Twilight Princess establishes a completely different group of Sages, despite taking place relatively soon after the events of Ocarina of Time; this disparity has never been fully explained, although the book Hyrule Historia reveals there are three distinct timelines branching out from the events of Ocarina. These Sages are a group of identical-looking elderly men who are made out of light, and wear Kabuki-like masks, and the keepers of the prison known as Arbiter's Grounds. They attempted to execute Ganondorf for his crimes, but the Triforce of Power gave him immortality, and the wizard killed the Sage of Water and claimed their execution weapon, the Sword of the Sages, for his own. The remaining five Sages used the Mirror of Twilight to banish Ganondorf to the Twilight Realm to protect themselves and Hyrule. During the game's events, the Sages reveal themselves and this story to Link, tasking him with finding the shards of the shattered Mirror to reopen the passage to the Twilight Realm and gain power there to defeat Ganondorf and his minion Zant. The Sages are also the ones who announce Link's companion Midna as the Princess of the Twili people.

Another group of Sages appears in The Legend of Zelda: A Link Between Worlds; they appear to be descendants of the Seven Sages from Ocarina of Time. In this era, the Sages' chief duty is protecting the Triforce of Courage from the forces of darkness, as only their combined power can reveal its hiding place. After the mysterious kingdom of Lorule loses its own Triforce due to a ferocious war, the passionate but misguided Princess of the realm, Hilda, decides to have her minion Yuga kidnap the Seven Sages and use their power to assemble Hyrule's Triforce that she might take it for herself. Yuga does this by turning the Sages into paintings, which are used for a ritual which summons Ganon and binds his Triforce of Power to Yuga himself; the sorcerer also kidnaps Zelda and siphons her Triforce of Wisdom. Hilda, pretending to be Link's ally, instructs the hero to gather the Six Sages' paintings, free them, and convince them to grant him the Triforce of Courage, which would give her control of all three pieces. The Sages of this era are:
 Gulley: A young boy and the son of Hyrule's Blacksmith, he is a friend of Link's, who in this time period is the Blacksmith's apprentice. Gulley wears green, loves animals, and spends much of his time outdoors, implying a connection to the Sage of Forest. His youthful enthusiasm is unbounded, though he is confused about his powers, referring to himself as a "Sixsage".
 Rosso: A stout, strong man and a miner who works on Hyrule's Death Mountain. He befriends Link and gives him the Power Glove to allow him to lift rocks. Rosso's red hair, somewhat inhuman features (including pure black eyes), and ties to rocks imply a connection to the Gorons, and thus the position of the Sage of Fire. Humorously, after being restored, Rosso reveals that he has always known about his sagely duty—he simply never bothered to mention it.
 Osfala: A prideful young man and the apprentice of Sahasrahla, Elder of Kakariko Village. Osfala arrogantly assumed himself to be the hero destined to save Princess Zelda and tried to challenge Yuga head-on, only to fail miserably and be transformed into a painting. After Link frees him, Osfala apologizes, acknowledges Link as a true hero, and agrees to help summon the Triforce. His yellow clothing and white hair tie him to the Sage of Light.
 Irene: An apprentice witch (she boasts of being the "best witch of her generation", despite being the only witch in that generation). She is told by a fortune teller to "take care of green", and takes this to mean Link, who wears green clothing. Though caustic, she considers Link a friend and is eager to help him as one of the Sages. It is suggested that she is a descendant of the Sage of Spirit.
 Oren: The Queen of the Zora. Link initially helps her when her Smooth Stone is stolen, causing her to overflow with power and bloat to a massive size. After being restored to normal, she goes for a swim, only to be kidnapped by Yuga. She praises Link as among the best humans she knows and urges him to defeat Yuga, so she may return to her people. As a Zora, she is descended from the Sage of Water.
 Seres: A nun in Hyrule's Sanctuary and a gentle soul. Seres is the first of the Sages to be transformed into a painting, an action Link witnesses firsthand; he travels to Princess Zelda to tell her about this action, which spurs his quest. After being saved from the forces of darkness, she sincerely thanks Link and promises to help him however she can. She has no apparent connection to any element, which suggests that she is a descendant of Zelda herself.
 Impa: Zelda's loyal handmaiden, who in this incarnation is an elderly woman. She immediately believes Link's warnings about Yuga and agrees to help the young hero on his quest. Despite her courage, though, Yuga still transforms her into a painting and uses her in his evil rituals. As she is the "latest" Impa, she is likely this generation's Sage of Shadow.

Champions
The Champions appear in The Legend of Zelda: Breath of the Wild and Hyrule Warriors: Age of Calamity. They consisted of four of the best warriors of the races across the land and were formed by Princess Zelda and the King of Hyrule to combat Calamity Ganon. They had the duty of piloting the Divine Beasts and assisting Link in delivering the final blow to Ganon. One hundred years prior to the events of Breath of the Wild, they were killed by the Blight monsters Ganon created to take control of the Divine Beast and the Guardians to devastate Hyrule. The Champions remained powerless for a century until Link freed the Divine Beasts from Ganon's influence, allowing them to complete their task.
 Mipha: The empathetic Zora Champion and pilot of the elephant-like Vah Ruta. A beloved Zora princess, Mipha was King Dorephan's daughter; she possessed unique healing abilities not shared by others of her race. She was Link's childhood friend and created a suit of Zora Armor to be given to Link, for whom she held romantic feelings, but did not get a chance to present the armor to Link before her death. While her father and brother were aware of her feelings for Link, she kept them secret from her mentor Muzu due to his prejudice against Hylians. She grants Link "Mipha's Grace'', which revives Link once his heart meter depletes. Voiced by: Amelia Gotham
 Daruk: The courageous Goron Champion and pilot of the salamander-like Vah Rudania. Although usually calm, he becomes loud and ferocious during battle and believes in Link's fighting capabilities. He grants Link "Daruk's Protection'', which protects Link from attacks. Voiced by: Joe Hernandez (English); Kouji Takeda (Japanese)
 Revali: The prideful Rito Champion and pilot of the bird-like Vah Medoh. Revali is skilled in aerial battles and has exceptional sight and archery skills. He believes himself to be superior to Link in every way and finds it insulting that Link is the chosen one to stop Ganon instead of him, He changes his views on the Hylian hero after Link frees his spirit from Calamity Ganon. He grants Link "Revali's Gale", a powerful vertical wind column that blows Link into the air. Voiced by: Sean Chiplock
 Urbosa: The Gerudo Champion and pilot of the camel-like Vah Naboris, Urbosa is a strong and courageous leader who showcases care and concern for Princess Zelda's well-being because she was good friends with Zelda's mother, the deceased Queen of Hyrule. Urbosa still feels bitter about her failure as a Champion one hundred years before. However, she expresses personal pleasure in being able to help defeat her people's shame (as one of Ganon's previous incarnations was a Gerudo himself). She grants Link "Urbosa's Fury", a devastating electric attack.

In the present-day setting of Breath of the Wild, Link meets new allies from each of the Champions' respective races who help him in entering each Divine Beast and freeing them from Ganon's control. In Age of Calamity, they are summoned from the future to save the Champions from being killed by the Blight Ganons.
 Sidon: Mipha's younger brother and heir to the Zora throne, Sidon is admired by the Zora for his strength and optimism. Link is invited by Sidon to stop Vah Ruta from flooding Zora's Domain and causing terrible damage to the surrounding regions, as the Zoras (being weak to electricity) can't use the Shock Arrows needed to disable the Divine Beast. Sidon also helps Link win the support of the prejudiced Muzu by proving Mipha's love for him with the Zora Armor. A younger version of Sidon is briefly seen in a flashback during the Champion's Ballad DLC, and again in Age of Calamity where he bravely stands up to a Lynel despite the danger. Voiced by: Jamie Montellaro (English); Kousuke Oonishi (Japanese)
 Yunobo: A young Goron and a descendant of Daruk. Though a bit cowardly, Yunobo possesses Daruk's power of Protection and helps Link enter Vah Rudania by using it to become a cannonball powerful enough to disable the Divine Beast. In Age of Calamity, Yunobo can eat special Rock Roasts to change the effects of his Protection when he attacks. Voiced by: Joe Hernandez
 Teba: A Rito archer known for his great skill in combat but also his intense focus and temper. With the Rito unable to fly freely for fear of getting shot down by Vah Medoh, Teba intends to attack the Divine Beast by himself with no regard for the consequences. Teba agrees to let Link join him on the attack after seeing his skill in midair archery, drawing the Vah Medoh's attacks away so Link can disable it and climb aboard. Voiced by: Sean Chiplock
 Makeela Riju: The current chief of the Gerudo, having taken the throne at a very young age after her mother's death. Though respected by the Gerudo, Riju feels her age and inexperience prevents her from being the ideal queen. Link wins her support by retrieving the Gerudo's treasured Thunder Helm from the Yiga Clan, which she uses to deter the lightning from Vah Naboris so Link can disable and board it. In battle, Riju rides on a shield pulled by her favorite sand seal Patricia.

Tingle

Tingle is a eccentric middle-aged man who is obsessed with fairies and believes himself to be the reincarnation of one. He wears a green bodysuit and first appeared in Majora's Mask, where he was found floating around on a balloon selling maps.

He subsequently appeared in Wind Waker, first in a jail room located on Windfall Island, and then in a tall wooden tower, where again he acted as a map maker.

He has also appeared in Oracle of Ages, Four Swords Adventures and The Minish Cap.

He cameos in Phantom Hourglass as a poster, in Spirit Tracks, an almost shop figurine, and in Skyward Sword as a doll in Zelda's room at the Knight Academy. He is a playable character via downloadable content in Hyrule Warriors.

Tingle has gained some notoriety, being ranked first on IGN's list of weird Zelda characters. He has gone on to feature in his own games, including Freshly-Picked Tingle's Rosy Rupeeland.

In Twilight Princess, the character Purlo was designed as a more realistic version of Tingle.  He is similar in appearance, and shares Tingle's obsession with Rupees, but can be hostile and unfriendly.

Recurring characters
Many minor characters in the games have returned multiple times throughout the series, having Link in some form perform minor tasks for them.

Agitha
Agitha first appears in Twilight Princess. She is a cheery ten-year-old girl who calls herself the "Princess of Bugs" and lives in a house in Hyrule Castle Town. Agitha asks Link to help her collect twelve pairs of Golden Bugs for a ball she is having, with the promise of awards for his help. She returns in Hyrule Warriors as a playable character, armed with her parasol and using her golden bugs to fight for her.

Anju
Anju first appears in Ocarina of Time but is unnamed and generally referred to as the "Cucco Lady". She resides in Impa's old house in Kakariko Village. She says that she is allergic to Cuccos, and hers are always escaping from their pen. The first time that Link rounds them up for her, he receives an empty bottle in return.

Majora's Mask is the first Zelda game in which Anju is named. She is troubled over the disappearance of her fiancé, Kafei. In a lengthy side-quest resulting in the reunion of those betrothed, Link can acquire several masks: the Keaton Mask, the Kafei Mask, the Postman's Hat, and the Couple's Mask.

Anju reappears in The Minish Cap, wherein she again employs Link's help to retrieve her Cuccos, compensating with rupees and a Piece of Heart.

Beedle
Beedle, also known as Terry in different localizations of the games, is a traveling merchant who sells Link numerous items to help aid him as well sometimes exotic items. He also values his consumers with rewards discounts. He first appears in The Wind Waker where he can be found around numerous islands in the Great Sea on his boat shop.

In The Minish Cap, Beedle appears in Hyrule Town selling Picolyte after Link fuses kinstones and clears the area with the Gust Jar.

In Phantom Hourglass, his role is the same as that in The Wind Waker, but he sells boat parts.

In Spirit Tracks his role is the same but instead of a boat, he is seen soaring above in a balloon across New Hyrule. Link must bring the boy from Aboda Village to Beedle to fulfill his dream of flying. Beedle agrees to have him on board. Link also has to obtain a Force Gem from Beedle.

In Skyward Sword his role is the same, traveling from his island home to Skyloft in a pedal-powered wooden shack with helicopter-type propellers that serves as his shop. He has a pet beetle that goes missing partway through the game; if Link retrieves it, Beedle offers him a permanent discount at his shop. If Link attempts to leave his shop without purchasing anything, Beedle expresses his annoyance before pulling a rope that drops Link through a trapdoor onto the ground below.

In Breath of the Wild, he travels on foot with a large backpack, and he is often seen at different stables.

IGN ranked him number 14 on its list of the Top 20 Weirdest Zelda Characters.

Biggoron
Biggoron is a Goron who is approximately the size of a mountain. He first appears in Ocarina of Time, where he can be found sitting atop Death Mountain, scratching at his dry eyes. He has a brother named Medigoron who resides in the second level of the Goron city and will sell Link the Giant’s Knife. At the end of a trading sequence, Link gives the giant special Eye Drops; in return, Biggoron makes the Biggoron's Sword, which is unbreakable and inflicts twice as much as damage as the Master Sword but prevents Link from using his shield.

In Majora's Mask, Biggoron has been cursed with invisibility by the Skull Kid, and sits at the far end of the narrow ridge which leads to Snowhead Temple, blowing gusts of wind to prevent anyone from traversing the path (which caused the Goron Darmani to fall off and die). Once Link learns the Goron Lullaby, he uses this to lull Biggoron to sleep, thus making the giant fall off the cliff and allow access to the Snowhead Temple.

In Oracle of Seasons, Biggoron can be found at the top of Goron Mountain, where he is suffering from a terrible cold. Link gives him some Lava Soup for this illness in exchange for the Goron Vase. Through a linked game with passwords, Link can tell Biggoron a password which then gives Link Biggoron's Sword.

In The Minish Cap, he resides in the mountains near Veil Falls, only appearing once Link fuses kinstones with a Goron in a cave near Lon Lon Ranch. The giant is hungry and asks Link for a shield to eat; when Link returns, after Biggoron has eaten, he presents Link with the Mirror Shield.

In Phantom Hourglass, Biggoron is not his usual monstrous size, but of normal Goron height—though he remains the largest on Goron Island. Here he has a son named Gongoron. Link is required to answer his questions before being allowed to explore the island further.

Dampé
Dampé is an old gravekeeper who appears in multiple games. He can be recognized by his pale skin and hunched back.

He first appears in Ocarina of Time where he can be found in the Kakariko Village graveyard. As Child Link he's usually inside his hut sleeping, but, at sunset, he appears outside for a few hours, where he provides a mini-game for Link to try to win a piece of heart. As Adult Link, Dampé is dead and Link must enter his grave to claim the hookshot. Once inside, Dampé's ghost challenges him to a race. Link must follow him to obtain the hookshot without failing.

In Majora's Mask, he can be found in the Ikana Graveyard. During the day, he walks around outside. It takes an entire day, however, for him to return to his hut. If Link wears the Captain's Hat whilst talking to him, he gets scared and quickly rushes inside. On the final day, he can be found underground in the graveyard looking for a treasure which Link helps him find.

In Four Swords Adventures, he is found at the graveyard in the swamp area. Link can talk to him. He warns Link that he should not be out late and tells about the Forest of Light.

In The Minish Cap, he is found in the Royal Valley in western Hyrule where Link can fuse kinstones with him. He gives Link the Graveyard key.

In A Link Between Worlds, he appears as the graveyard's caretaker near the sanctuary, in both Hyrule and Lorule.

In the Nintendo Switch remake of The Legend of Zelda: Link's Awakening, he runs the Chamber Dungeon side mode, where players can assemble a dungeon from pieces of the dungeons they've already completed and additional Chamber Stone pieces.

Great Fairy
Great Fairies appear in all of the games, except for Skyward Sword, as giant fairies that reside in springs called "Great Fairy's Fountains". They are much older than other fairies, and are thus much more powerful. Most of those depicted wear dresses, full-length or knee-length, though in Ocarina of Time, Majora's Mask, Twilight Princess, and Breath of the Wild they are more risque. According to their figurine in The Wind Waker, they were born on the Angular Isles, and they are destined to aid the "Great Hero", Link. In all games, they will completely refill Link's health. In some of their appearances, they will reward Link with new items or upgrades of his items or meters, usually for merely visiting them, though sometimes he must complete a task. These tasks usually involve some selflessness on the part of the player. In Hyrule Warriors, one of Link's unlockable weapons allows the player to control a Great Fairy, with Link held in a bottle that she carries with her.

Guru-Guru
Guru-Guru is a bald, bearded man who's always seen playing the "Song of Storms" on what looks like an organ grinder. He first appears in Ocarina of Time where he's found inside the Windmill in Kakariko Village, happily playing away. In the future, he's angry because seven years ago a young boy played the Song of Storms with a magical ocarina, messing up the windmill. Unaware Link is that same boy, he teaches him the "Song of Storms", and Link returns to the past to fulfill his predetermined destiny, draining the well to access the next dungeon.

In Majora's Mask he's part of the Gorman Troupe set to play at the Clock Town Carnival. During the day he can be found playing in the troupe's room in the Stock Pot Inn. He's found at the Laundry Pool during the night because his playing annoys the other members greatly. Sometime before Link's arrival to Termina, he was a member of a different troupe, led by a dog. Out of anger and jealousy, he steals from the leader the Bremen Mask and gives it to the player after confessing his story. By wearing the mask and marching, Link can make some animals follow him, and is required to obtain the Bunny Hood by helping a flock of baby Cuccos reach adulthood as they march.

In Oracle of Seasons, he's found beside a windmill again in the Eastern Suburbs of Holodrum. Here, Link can trade him the engine grease for a phonograph to continue the trading sequence for the Noble Sword.

IGN ranked him number 13 on its list of the Top 20 Weirdest Zelda Characters.

Hylia
Hylia, the goddess of light who was reborn as the first incarnation of Zelda, became the ancestor of the Hyrule Royal Family and was the namesake of the Hylians. She is depicted throughout the games by statues and imagery, often depicted as having angelic wings and holding a sword in her right hand.

Malon
 has appeared in several games in the series, and is almost always found at Lon Lon Ranch with her father Talon. Like the series' protagonist, Link, and its namesake, Princess Zelda, Malon is depicted with many varying incarnations. Her largest appearance is in Ocarina of Time, where she interacts with Link on various occasions when he visits the ranch. Link helps Malon and her father with their ordeals while she mainly raises Epona, and teaches Link Epona's Song, which can call the horse to Link at any time. In other games, she has smaller roles, involving Link helping Malon and Talon. If Link beats Malon's record of 50 seconds on an obstacle course on Epona, she will put a cow in his house in Kokiri Forest.

In Oracle of Seasons, she and her father breed Cuccos north of Horon Village near Eyeglass Lake in Holodrum. As part of the trading quest, if Link gives her the Cuccodex, she will give him the Lon Lon Egg.

In Four Swords Adventures, the four Links guide Malon to her father, Talon, when her path is blocked by castle knights. Upon reuniting her with Talon, he gives the Links permission to use his horses, which appear when one of the Links touch a carrot. She also makes an appearance in The Minish Cap, where Link helps her and Talon back into their house by finding a key, later moving to the town to sell Lon Lon Milk.

Maple
Maple is an apprentice witch serving under her grandmother Syrup. She first appears in Oracle of Seasons and Oracle of Ages, frequently flying by Link on her broomstick. Upon crashing into Link, he and Maple will both drop their items, prompting a race between them to gather up as many of them as possible. As the game continues, Maple will upgrade her broomstick to a vacuum cleaner and, in a linked game, a U.F.O., each being faster and making the item races more challenging. Maple is also a part of the trading sequence in both games, as she seeks a Lon Lon Egg in Seasons and a Touching Book in Ages.

In the Game Boy Advance remake of A Link to the Past, Maple appears inside the magic potion shop as the salesclerk, replacing the unnamed shopkeeper character from the original version of the game.

Marin
Marin is a young girl who appears in The Legend of Zelda: Link's Awakening. She finds Link washed ashore on Koholint Island and nurses him back to health, after which she spends her time in the village with her father Tarin. Marin is loved by the villagers for her singing, specifically her favorite song, the Ballad of the Wind Fish. In the good ending, if the player does not die during the entire game, the Wind Fish grants her desire by reincarnating her as a seagull.

Marin appears as a trophy in Super Smash Bros. Melee. She is also a playable character through downloadable content in Hyrule Warriors Legends, in which she fights using the Sea Lily's Bell and by summoning the Wind Fish for wide-range attacks.

Mutoh
Mutoh is an old, short-tempered boss of a group of carpenters who are responsible for building structures around Hyrule and other lands. However, his employees are always either lazy or lost and he has to yell at them. He first appears in Ocarina of Time where during the present he is busy constructing a building in Kakariko Village. Seven years later in the future, they are found in Gerudo Valley where all the carpenters except Mutoh are captured by the Gerudo after a failed attempt at joining them. Link later has to help free them so they can escape. In this game only, he has two children, Anju and Grog.

In Majora's Mask, his carpenters are busy getting ready for the Clock Town carnival however Mutoh is busy arguing with the mayor to keep the carnival running. The guards are arguing and want to close the fair in fear that the moon will fall from the sky. On the Final Day, he is the only one found outside the clock tower; everyone else has fled. In the final scene, he is seen running towards Stone Tower.

In Oracle of Ages, he is responsible for building the bridge connecting Nuun Highlands to Symmetry City in Labrynna. However, all the carpenters have scattered across the highlands and he asks Link to find them so they can build the bridge.

In The Minish Cap, he is found in Hyrule Town where if Link fuses kinstones with him, the carpenters will construct houses for either Nayru, Din or Farore to live in. When not working, they are located in the sawmill in the town.

Skull Kid
Skull Kid is a young Imp who first appears in the Nintendo 64 video game The Legend of Zelda: Ocarina of Time. He is dressed in a red cloak and hat covering an underlayer of clothing. There are a few Imps that can be found in the Lost Woods, a maze-like forest. Two play a memory game with Link as a child, and one rewards him if he plays a particular song for him on his ocarina. However, if Link, as an adult, meets Skull Kid, he shall attack him out of fear. It is possible to defeat the Skull Kid; doing so rewards Link with 200 Rupees.

In the direct sequel, The Majora's Mask, the Skull Kid is seen cavorting with a pair of fairies named Tatl and Tael. He steals a mask called Majora's Mask which grants him great power but corrupts him. Under the influence of its power, he cursed many of the inhabitants of Termina, Link included, and caused the moon to fall toward Clock Town. He also treats Tatl and Tael poorly. He is thwarted when his old friends the Four Giants of Termina stop the moon from falling and Link defeats Majora. Afterward, Skull Kid befriends Link and reunites with his fairies as well as the Four Giants. At the end, the Skull Kid notes that Link "smells a lot like that fairy kid who taught [him] that song in the woods", suggesting that he is the same Skull Kid as seen in Ocarina of Time.

Skull Kid also makes an appearance in the Nintendo GameCube/Wii game, The Legend of Zelda: Twilight Princess. Skull Kid made a cameo appearance in Super Smash Bros. Brawl as a pair of stickers. He also appears in The Legend of Zelda manga. Soon after the events of Ocarina of Time, Link met the Skull Kid in the Lost Woods, who was one of the Skull Kids who work for the Baga Tree, the evil rival of the Deku Tree. Skull Kid appears as a playable character in Hyrule Warriors Legends and Cadence of Hyrule.

The character drew a positive reception from critics. Screen Rant editor Jason Chamberlain ranked Skull Kid as one of the best supporting characters in the overall The Legend of Zelda series, saying that "with [the] memorable cast of characters [of Majora's Mask], perhaps none of them are more memorable than the misunderstood 'villain' of the story, Skull Kid", who "[i]s essentially a lonely kid who los[es] his way" in dealing with themes of resentment and abandonment. CBR noted that Skull Kid's characterization, in particular their depiction in The Legend of Zelda: Majora's Mask manga series, featured "layers of depth unseen in games at the time" and his motivations made him a superior antagonist compared to Ganondorf, "[who] just craves power", Bloody Disgusting praised the character's physical design in Majora's Mask, stating that "[w]hat immediately stands out about Skull Kid is his mask; with its heart-shaped design, vibrant colors, and other eccentric features, the mask exudes a mystic appeal". IGN editor Lucas M. Thomas listed Skull Kid as a good addition for the video game Super Smash Bros. Brawl, when he was the first likely included amongst the other characters listed.

Skull Kid's appearance in the 2016 short fan film Majora's Mask: Terrible Fate, voiced by Joe Zieja, received widespread attention among The Legend of Zelda fandom and critical acclaim.

Syrup
Syrup is a friendly old witch who first appears in Oracle of Seasons and Oracle of Ages. She specializes in selling restorative potions and is Maple's grandmother. In Oracle of Seasons her shop is found in Sunken City in Eastern Holodrum where it can only be accessed during winter. During the quest for the Noble Sword, Link must trade her a Mushroom for a Wooden Bird, and she will not sell Magic Potions until she receives the Mushroom. In Oracle of Ages, her shop is located in Yoll Graveyard during the present in Labrynna. At one point, Link must use one of her Magic Potions to cure King Zora's illness.

In The Minish Cap, her shop is found in the Minish Woods. Link has to purchase from her the Wake-Up Mushroom for Rem the Shoemaker so to wake him up. At first, she only sells Blue Potions, but after Link fuses kinstones with a Minish in South Hyrule Field, she will then start selling Red Potions.

Talon
Talon is Malon's father and the owner of Lon Lon Ranch who first appears in Ocarina of Time. Link first finds him sleeping outside Hyrule castle. Link uses a cucco to wake him up and then hurries back to find Malon. Later, if Link heads to Lon Lon Ranch, he can participate in a mini-game to earn a bottle of milk. Also at the farm is his farmhand Ingo, who seven years later is given the ranch by Ganondorf, which forces Talon to stay at Kakariko Village. However, he returns once Link defeats Ingo in a horse race.

In Majora's Mask, in Termina (which is set in a parallel universe), Talon is known as Mr. Barten and is the bartender of the Milk Bar in Clock Town. On the Final Day, he does not leave the town over the falling moon and instead stays at the bar.

In Oracle of Seasons, his farm is found north of Horon Village, where he is again with Malon where they raise Cuccos. Talon is found sleeping at Mt. Cucco; if Link wakes him up with the Megaphone, he'll give him the Mushroom as part of the trading quest.

In Four Swords Adventures, he is seen briefly when Link returns Malon after rescuing her. He allows Link to use their horses by collecting carrots.

In The Minish Cap, he can be found at Lon Lon Ranch east of Hyrule Town where he has lost the keys to his house. However, Link is able to find the spare key by shrinking to help them get inside.

In Link's Awakening, a similar character named Tarin appears as Marin's father. Early in the game, Tarin is turned into a raccoon when he eats a strange mushroom in the forest and blocks Link's path until the transformation is undone with Magic Powder. Later, Link gives Tarin a stick as part of the trading sequence. He uses it to try and shoo bees away from a honeycomb but is chased off by the angry swarm, leaving Link to take the honeycomb.

Spin-off characters

Cia
Cia is the main villain of the first half of Hyrule Warriors. Appointed as the guardian of the Triforce of Power with control over time, she was once a kindhearted young woman who had feelings for Link until her jealousy for Zelda allowed Ganondorf to corrupt her soul with evil, barring a single remaining portion of good that manifests as her twin, Lana. After gathering a mighty army, Cia uses her powers to open gates through time to cause havoc and destruction so that Ganondorf can return, after which he abandons her. This only causes Cia to grow even more obsessed and dangerous, and she is ultimately killed in battle.

In the expansion Hyrule Warriors Legends, Cia is discovered to still be alive in the world of The Wind Waker, as the evil Phantom Ganon is using her power to cross his world into Hyrule and conquer both. With help from Tetra and King Daphnes, Link and Lana revive Cia and the five of them banish Phantom Ganon, restoring the worlds to normal. Cia and Lana then leave to watch over the Triforce together in peace.

Volga
Volga is a major antagonist in Hyrule Warriors. His name and design is based on the dragon Volvagia from Ocarina of Time, even transforming into the dragon itself in some of his attacks. Cia finds him in the Eldin Caves and uses her power to brainwash him into her service, becoming one of her strongest generals and a recurring opponent for the heroes and especially Link to overcome. Volga eventually breaks free of Cia's control and demands a final battle with the heroes so that he can die satisfied as himself.

Lana
Lana is a supporting character in Hyrule Warriors. The light counterpart of the dark sorceress Cia, Lana manifested when Ganondorf twisted Cia's feelings for Link into an obsession for conquest. Fleeing into the Faron Woods, Lana created a resistance to fight Cia's growing power. After meeting with Link, Lana pledges to aid and protect him in any way, in part due to her own feelings for him.

Lana fights with a book of magic that controls lightning and has other weapons such as a Deku Spear infused with water magic and a special Summoning Gate that summons various monsters to fight. Even in battle, she maintains a happy and cheery personality and is very energetic.

Linkle 

Linkle is a playable character in Hyrule Warriors and its updated version Hyrule Warriors Legends. A young farmgirl who raises Cuccos in a local village, Linkle believes she is the reincarnated hero, encouraged by her grandmother's stories and the compass she inherited from her. When Cia's forces invade Hyrule, Linkle takes it as a sign that her destiny has come and sets out for Hyrule Castle. Due to her poor sense of direction, Linkle repeatedly loses her way and is drawn into multiple battles where she fights alongside various characters. In battle, Linkle's default weapon is a pair of miniature crossbows; she can also obtain a pair of magical boots to grant her a variety of powerful kicking and dashing attacks.

Astor
Astor is the main villain of Hyrule Warriors: Age of Calamity. Though little is known about him, he seeks the revival of Calamity Ganon above all else. He is able to harness the evil power of Calamity Ganon, dubbed Malice, in his attacks and can use it to summon the Blight Ganons and evil clones of the Champions called Hollows. Astor is accompanied by a small Malice-possessed Guardian called Harbinger Ganon, who he claims speaks of the future and uses this knowledge to guide the Yiga Clan and the various monsters of Hyrule in working together towards Calamity Ganon's revival. After being defeated in Hyrule Castle, Harbinger Ganon destroys Astor and uses his power to fully manifest as Calamity Ganon.

Terrako
Terrako is a small egg-like Guardian, a type of Ancient Sheikah robot, who appears in Hyrule Warriors: Age of Calamity. He was activated by Princess Zelda with a Blessed Screw when she was younger and became her companion after her mother died, but King Rhoam took him away from her and she soon forgot about Terrako over the years. When Calamity Ganon awakens and destroys Hyrule Castle, Terrako reactivates and opens a portal into the past, where it is found by Link and Impa during a monster invasion outside the castle. The Sheikah researchers learn that Terrako possesses knowledge of the future and use it to better prepare themselves against the Calamity. Terrako's presence allows Hyrule to alter the course of history for the better, such as preventing the Champions' deaths and awakening Zelda's latent powers before Link is critically wounded.

Unnoticed by all, a portion of Calamity Ganon's Malice follows Terrako into the past and possesses the original Terrako before it activates, becoming known as Harbinger Ganon and using its knowledge of the future to manipulate the seer Astor into bringing about the Calamity. Once Astor is no longer needed, Harbinger Ganon absorbs his power and sheds his prior form to become the fully-powered Calamity Ganon, and Terrako sacrifices itself by smashing into Ganon and rendering him vulnerable to damage. A series of post-game side-quests allow the heroes to gather parts to repair and reactivate Terrako, after which he becomes a playable character.

See also 

 Characters in the Mario franchise

Notes

References

Fantasy creatures
The Legend of Zelda characters
Legend of Zelda